The Benidorm Fest 2023 was the second edition of the annual Benidorm Fest, a television song contest held in Benidorm, organised and broadcast by RTVE. The show was held between 31 January and 4 February 2023, and was hosted by Mónica Naranjo, Inés Hernand and Rodrigo Vázquez. The winner of the competition was "Eaea" performed by Blanca Paloma, who will represent  in the Eurovision Song Contest 2023.

Format 
The competition consisted of two semi-finals and one final. In total, 18 candidate songs competed divided between the two semifinals, that is, nine participated in each one. In each semifinal, the four songs with the most votes among the professional juries (50%), the demographic panel (25%) and the televote (25%), went directly to the final. During the final, the eight qualified songs were performed again to determine which would represent Spain in the Eurovision Song Contest 2023, following the same voting system as in the semi-finals.

Presenters 
On 19 July 2022, RTVE announced singer Mónica Naranjo as the main host of Benidorm Fest 2023. Naranjo will be accompanied by Internet personality and comedian Inés Hernand, who will return to serve as co-host, and journalist and television presenter Rodrigo Vázquez.

Expert jury members 
On 19 July 2022, RTVE announced that the expert jury panel would be headed by composer, musician and record producer Nacho Cano. It was also announced that Swedish singer and television producer Christer Björkman will be among the international members of the expert jury. On 25 January 2023, RTVE announced the full eight-member jury line-up, with five international members and three national members. It was also announced that Cano would not be part of the jury as initially announced, citing professional scheduling reasons.

Guest performers 
Information about the guest performers was revealed during the Benidorm Fest week.

The first semi-final was opened by presenter Mónica Naranjo performing "Diva". The intervals acts included Leo Rizzi performing "Arcade", and Edurne, who represented Spain in the Eurovision Song Contest 2015, performing "Boomerang", "Te quedaste solo" and "Amores dormidos".

The second semi-final was opened by Miguel Poveda performing "Eres tú", while the interval featured Álvaro Soler performing "Candela", and Gloria Trevi performing "Gloria" and "Todos Me Miran".

The final was opened by Manuel Carrasco performing "Eres". The interval acts included presenter Mónica Naranjo performing her song "Sobreviviré", and Ana Mena performing "Un clásico" and "Las 12". In addition, previous winner Chanel made an appearance to hand the trophy to her successor.

Competing entries 
RTVE published the rules and regulations for Benidorm Fest 2023 on 19 July 2022. The submission period opened on 1 September 2022, with the window closing on 10 October 2022. In addition to the open submission, RTVE reserved the right to invite renowned singers and authors from the current music scene directly. Upon closing the submission period, RTVE announced that 876 entries had been received, 482 by the online form and 394 by record labels. 

The names of the chosen contestants were officially announced by RTVE on 25 October 2022, in a special broadcast on La 1 hosted by Inés Hernand, followed by a presentation event on 29 October, hosted by Julia Varela and Rodrigo Vázquez also on La 1. Among the competing artists is Blanca Paloma, who participated in 2022. The competing songs were released on RTVE Play and RTVE's website on 18 December 2022.

Semi-finals 
The two semi-finals were held on 31 January and 2 February 2023. The running order of the semi-finals, which was decided by the organizers, was revealed on the day of each of the shows.

Semi-final 1 
The first semi-final took place on 31 January 2023. Agoney, Alice Wonder, Fusa Nocta, and Megara qualified for the final. A total of 10,285 televotes were received during the semi-final, including 7,507 via SMS and 2,778 via phone call.

Semi-final 2 
The second semi-final took place on 2 February 2023. Blanca Paloma, José Otero, Karmento, and Vicco qualified for the final. A total of 11,224 televotes were received during the semi-final, including 7,808 via SMS and 3,416 via phone call.

Final 
The final took place on 4 February 2023. The running order of the final was decided by a draw held on 3 February 2023. A total of 34,997 televotes were received during the final, including 24,553 via SMS and 10,444 via phone call.

Ratings

Notes

References 

2023 song contests
Benidorm Fest
Eurovision Song Contest 2023